Falcon is a town in Cumberland and Sampson counties in the U.S. state of North Carolina. The population was 258 at the 2010 census.

History
Falcon Tabernacle was listed on the National Register of Historic Places in 1983.

Geography
Falcon is located in northeastern Cumberland County at  (35.192521, -78.648503). A small portion of the town extends east into Sampson County. The town is situated on the west side of the South River, a tributary of the Black River and part of the Cape Fear River watershed.

North Carolina Highway 82 passes through the center of the town, leading northwest  to Interstate 95 and south  to U.S. Route 13.

Demographics

As of the census of 2000, there were 328 people, 84 households, and 58 families residing in the town. The population density was 262.4 people per square mile (101.3/km2). There were 102 housing units at an average density of 81.6 per square mile (31.5/km2). The racial makeup of the town was 84.45% White, 9.45% African American, 0.61% Native American, 3.05% from other races, and 2.44% from two or more races. Hispanic or Latino of any race were 3.35% of the population.

There were 84 households, out of which 27.4% had children under the age of 18 living with them, 53.6% were married couples living together, 9.5% had a female householder with no husband present, and 29.8% were non-families. 22.6% of all households were made up of individuals, and 10.7% had someone living alone who was 65 years of age or older. The average household size was 2.50 and the average family size was 2.98.

In the town, the population was spread out, with 32.0% under the age of 18, 7.0% from 18 to 24, 20.1% from 25 to 44, 14.0% from 45 to 64, and 26.8% who were 65 years of age or older. The median age was 36 years. For every 100 females, there were 94.1 males. For every 100 females age 18 and over, there were 78.4 males.

The median income for a household in the town was $31,125, and the median income for a family was $38,500. Males had a median income of $28,750 versus $23,250 for females. The per capita income for the town was $10,387. About 3.3% of families and 17.6% of the population were below the poverty line, including none of those under age 18 and 7.1% of those age 65 or over.

References

Towns in Cumberland County, North Carolina
Towns in Sampson County, North Carolina
Towns in North Carolina
Fayetteville, North Carolina metropolitan area